Although traditional jazz has had a sizeable following for a long time in India, with the yearly Jazz Yatra festivals and the frequent collaboration between Indian classical and Western jazz musicians, the interest in the blues has more or less been incidental due to the shared ancestry with jazz. Nonetheless, there have been a few musicians who stay true to the genre. They have not only helped define, promote and keep the blues alive in India, but have also developed a very Indian flavor of this music form.

Contraband
Sagar Sarkar is considered the father of the Pune Blues style, and Contraband are credited as the earliest practitioners of it in Pune during the late 1980s to 1990s.

In a late 1990s interview about their hedonistic lifestyle, Sagar Sarkar is quoted as saying: "The jams we've had were centered around three guys: Nirmal Chandra Kumar, Samuel Wilson and Zubin Balsara. The other prominent guys were Devendra Gautam Singh, Naveen Shastri and Rohit Nagarkatti. We ran a circuit using little known Pune venues like Nadikinara, Madhur Milan, Jaws, our respective homes and the houses of anybody who'd cooperate. Anyone who knew about our venues were free to just carry their booze, instruments and tune in! Many a time we were joined by guests at our sessions, namely guitarists Sanjay Joseph, Milind Mulick, Jayant Sankrityayana, Ashdin Bharucha, and bassist Jacob Panicker."

Classic Class 
Classic Class is a blues band to emerge from the New Delhi area. The band's musical style is a concoction of old school blues with a mix of contemporary rock and funky vibes. Their last two years have been a self study in the blues genre; playing with it, fusing it, concocting it and attempting to find our own sound in the midst of multiple internal musical contradictions and in all honesty, we are loving the journey more than any of us could care for the destination.

Soulmate 

Soulmate is a North-east India based blues band, which according to their Myspace page "... came together in Shillong, in February 2003 playing their first concert at the ‘Roots Festival at the Water Sports Complex in Umiam.

Soulmate is primarily made up of artists Rudy Wallang (guitar/vocals/songwriter) and Tipriti 'Tips' Kharbangar (vocals/guitar), although they frequently team up with local artists (on drums, bass and possibly other backup instruments) when on tour.

Soulmate gained nationwide recognition and popularity within the Jazz and Blues circles in India after they became the only blues band to represent the country (Courtesy The Blues Club of India) at the 23rd International Blues Challenge organized by the Blues Foundation, in Memphis, Tennessee, US, in February 2007. They were semi-finalists and performed at the Rum Boogie Café (Blues Club of The Year, 2007) alongside 150 other bands and musicians from all over the world.

As of February 2014, Soulmate has released three albums: Shillong, Moving On and Ten Stories Up.

Smokestack
Smokestack is a band from Pune, who named themselves after the song by Howling Wolf. They grouped together as a band sometime in 2006 and started off as a purist acoustic blues trio. However, soon after formation, they began experimenting with folk and roots music as well as rhythmic influences from around the world. This led to expanding the band to include drums and electric guitars. 

Smokestack is currently made up of:
 Anoop Kumar - Vocals, Acoustic Guitar, Bass
 Michael Thompson - Harmonica
 Vishal Gore - Vocals, Electric Guitar, Bass
 Shreyas Iyengar - Drums, Percussion
 Vidula Andromeda - Vocals, Harmonica

They have previously had a few other musicians as full/part-time members of their group:
 Varun Venkit - Drums, Percussion, Occasional singing
 Sarathy Korwar - Drums, Percussion
 Siddharth Sharma - Bass Guitar

They frequently play with other musicians who are well known names in the local Indian jazz/blues and rock scene, many of whom also stay in Pune.

Blues Conscience 
Blues Conscience is a blues trio from Chennai that was started in 2008 by Anek Ahuja, Aum Janakiram and Neil Smith, for the sole purpose of promoting the blues in today’s rock and metal influenced live music culture. As a three-piece outfit, their roots go deep into some of the greats that have played the blues such as B.B. King, Buddy Guy, Jimi Hendrix, Cream, Eric Clapton and Stevie Ray Vaughan.

They provide a fully suited up act, retaining every essence of the blues while also performing renditions of their own such as "Kamasutra", "Shaggin Ma Dog" and "Barack Obama?" Often called a “feel good band" that is constantly engaging the audience with the right energy, they are a band like no other.

On the bass and vocals is Anek Ahuja, Aum Janakiram on guitars/vocals and Neil Smith on the drums.

The Saturday Night Blues Band
One of the only mainstream blues bands in India, was formed in October 1999. The band, made up of some of Kolkata’s working musicians, has been performing every Saturday night at
Someplace Else, the “Music Mecca” of India - The Park Hotel, downtown Kolkata - for over a decade.

The Saturday Night Blues Band has performed in a multitude of venues across the country - Not Just Jazz by The Bay, Seijo’s, Henry Thams, The Blue Frog – Mumbai, Haze Blues and Jazz Bar,
Turquoise Cottage, QBA – Delhi, The Leather Bar, The Madras Cricket Club, Presidency Club – Chennai, East Coast Golf Club, The Bamboo Bay - Visakhapatnam

Ajay Srivastav 
Ajay Srivastav is a British musician and songwriter of Indian heritage who merges Blues and Roots styles with elements of Indian Folk. His line up includes resonator guitar, tabla, upright bass and drums. Lyrically he is inspired by Indian Vedanta philosophy. His albums 'Karmic Blues' (2019) and 'Powerless' (2021) showcase his unique guitar style which blends Bluesgrass, Fingerpicking, raaga and slide styles.

Delta blues 
Guitarist Kapil Chetri, New Delhi is credited to be one of the first sounds in India who deals primarily with Delta blues and other finger style-plucking, acoustic blues styles. Though the Big Bang Blues is more of a blues rock band, Kapil brings in the raw Mississippi sound to the group. 

Guitarist Arjun Chandran is another exponent of this style. He has even experimented with delta blues- fusing it with jazz, electronica and other forms of musical styles.

References 

Blues music genres